Humana Deshumanización (Human Dehumanization) is the seventh studio album by Colombian group Kraken  It was released on 24 April 2009, by Athena Productions. The first single from the album was "El Tiempo no Miente Jamás". The second one was "Rompiendo el Hechizo", and the third "Extraña Predicción".

Track listing

References 

Kraken (band) albums
2009 albums